Danaba was a town and bishopric in the late Roman province of Phoenicia Secunda.

Location 

Danaba is mentioned by Ptolemy (V, xv, 24) as a town in the territory of Palmyra. According to the Roman road guide known as Peutinger's table (where it is called Danova) it was a Roman military station between Damascus and Palmyra, twenty miles from Nezala.

Today Danaba may be represented by Hafer, a village five miles southeast of Sadad, which in the early 20th century was in the Ottoman vilayet of Damascus; about 300 Jacobite Syrians lived there, most of whom had been converted to Catholicism. Sadad and Mahïn have also been proposed as its location.

History

Danaba figures in an Antiochene Notitia episcopatuum of the 6th century as a suffragan of Damascus, and remained so till perhaps the 10th century. Only two bishops are known: Theodore, who attended the Council of Chalcedon in 451, and who subscribed the letter of the bishops of the province to Byzantine Emperor Leo I the Thracian in 458 regarding the murder of Proterius of Alexandria, and Eulogius, present at the Second Council of Constantinople in 553.

No longer a residential bishopric, Danaba is included in the Catholic Church's list of titular sees.

Sources
 Danaba is also mentioned in the book of Jasper. It's king was Angius king of Africa in Danaba. Who fought with Sephora,son of Eliphaze, son of Essau.

References 

Catholic titular sees in Asia